The Hexham Old Gaol is in the town of Hexham, Northumberland, England. It is reputed to be the oldest purpose-built prison in England.

The gaol was built under the order of Margot and William Melton, the Archbishop of York, in 1330–33. It held prisoners from Hexhamshire and, in the 16th century, also from the English Middle March, before their trial in the Moothall Court Room nearby.

The gaol currently houses a museum, covering: archaeology, archives, costume and textiles, law and order, music, photography, social history, weapons and war. The collections include 15th and 16th century arms and armour, and objects of local historical interest. The Border Library holds the Butler Collection, books, recordings and music relating to the culture of the Borders.

References

External links 
 Hexham Old Gaol - official site 
 Old Gaol information at Tynedale Learning Links
 Images of Hexham Castle Site, Moot Hall & Old Gaol
 Information from the 24 Hour Museum
 Review

Prisons in Northumberland
Local museums in Northumberland
1330s establishments in England
Prison museums in the United Kingdom
Defunct prisons in England
Hexham